The Lizard Springs Formation is a geologic formation in Trinidad and Tobago. It preserves fossils dating back to the Paleocene to Early Eocene period.

Fossil content 
 Alicantina

See also 
 List of fossiliferous stratigraphic units in Trinidad and Tobago

References

Bibliography

Further reading 
 W. A. van den Bold. 1957. Ostracoda from the Paleocene of Trinidad. Micropaleontology 3(1):1-18

Geologic formations of Trinidad and Tobago
Paleogene Trinidad and Tobago